The following lists events that happened during  1942 in New Zealand.

Population
 Estimated population as of 31 December: 1,636,400
 Increase since 31 December 1941: 5200 (0.32%)
 Males per 100 females: 94.2

Incumbents

Regal and viceregal
Head of State – George VI
Governor-General – Marshal of the Royal Air Force Sir Cyril Newall GCB OM GCMG CBE AM

Government
The life of the 26th New Zealand Parliament was extended for a further year (to 1942) due to World War II, with the Labour Party in government.

Speaker of the House – Bill Barnard (Democratic Labour Party)
Prime Minister – Peter Fraser
Minister of Finance – Walter Nash
Minister of Foreign Affairs – Frank Langstone then Peter Fraser
Attorney-General – Rex Mason
Chief Justice — Sir Michael Myers

Parliamentary opposition 
 Leader of the Opposition –  Sidney Holland (National Party).

Main centre leaders
Mayor of Auckland – John Allum
Mayor of Hamilton – Harold Caro
Mayor of Wellington – Thomas Hislop
Mayor of Christchurch – Ernest Andrews
Mayor of Dunedin – Andrew Allen

Events

January–March 
 8 March – Japanese Warrant Officer Nobuo Fujita of the Imperial Japanese Navy conducts aerial reconnaissance of Wellington. His Yokosuka E14y reconnaissance plane had been catapulted into the air from the Japanese submarine  which stored the plane in a sealed foredeck hangar. After a successful daylight tour the submarine and plane headed north to make an inspection of Auckland on 13 March.

April–June 
 27 April – Rationing on sugar and women's stockings is introduced.
 24 May –  briefly operated off northern New Zealand in May 1942. I-21s floatplane flown by Lt Ito Isuma conducted a reconnaissance flight over Thames and then Auckland on 24 May.
 29 May – Rationing on clothing, footwear and linen is introduced, with an allowance of 52 coupons per year.
12 June First US Troop arrived 1942 at Waitematā Harbour in Auckland.
 24 June – A severe earthquake, the 1942 Wairarapa earthquake struck the lower North Island, followed by a severe aftershock on 2 August. Considerable damage resulted in Masterton, other parts of the Wairarapa, Palmerston North and Wellington.

July–September

October–December 
 9 December – 37 of the 39 female patients in Ward 5 at Seacliff Lunatic Asylum (psychiatric hospital) are killed in a night-time fire – the country's worst fire disaster at that time.
 13 December – Abel Tasman's first sighting of New Zealand 300 years earlier is commemorated in Hokitika (initially this was planned for Ōkārito but this was changed after it was cut off by flooding) by a Dutch delegation led by Charles van der Plas and hosted by the New Zealand government

Date unknown 

 Japanese submarines operate in New Zealand waters in 1942 and 1943. They send reconnaissance aircraft over Auckland and Wellington, but do not carry out any attacks.

Arts and literature

See 1942 in art, 1942 in literature

Music

See: 1942 in music

Radio

See: Public broadcasting in New Zealand

Film

See: :Category:1942 film awards, 1942 in film, List of New Zealand feature films, Cinema of New Zealand, :Category:1942 films

Sport
Most sports events were on hold due to the war.

Horse racing

Harness racing
 New Zealand Trotting Cup: Haughty 
 Auckland Trotting Cup: Loyal Friend

Rugby
:Category:Rugby union in New Zealand, Category:All Blacks
 Ranfurly Shield

Rugby league
New Zealand national rugby league team

Soccer
 Chatham Cup competition not held
 Provincial league champions: 
	Auckland:	Mount Albert Grammar School Old Boys
	Canterbury:	Western
	Hawke's Bay:	Napier HSOB
	Nelson:	No competition
	Otago:	Army
	South Canterbury:	No competition
	Southland:	No competition
	Waikato:	No competition
	Wanganui:	No competition
	Wellington:	Hospital

Births
 5 January: Trish McKelvey, cricketer.
 12 January: Doug Graham, politician
 23 January: Phil Clarke (rugby union), rugby union player
 23 February: John Lewis, headmaster 
 16 March: Gordon Whiting, Judge
 24 March: Kerry Burke, politician.
 21 April: Geoffrey Palmer, 33rd Prime Minister of New Zealand
 19 June: Merata Mita, filmmaker
 18 July: Mike Ward, politician
 4 August: David Lange, 32nd Prime Minister of New Zealand
 25 September: Peter Petherick, cricketer
 25 November: Barbara Bevege, cricketer
 Susan Wakefield, Tax expert
 Judith Potter, high court judge.
 Roger Walker. architect.

Deaths
 28 July: James Allen, politician and diplomat.
 15 July: Denis 'Sonny' Moloney, cricketer.
 17 July Robina Nicol, photographer and suffragist
 27 August: Francis Mander, politician
 12 October: Douglas Lysnar, politician.
 8 November: Tim Armstrong''', politician.
 
:Category:1942 deaths

See also
List of years in New Zealand
Timeline of New Zealand history
History of New Zealand
Military history of New Zealand
Timeline of the New Zealand environment
Timeline of New Zealand's links with Antarctica

References

 
Years of the 20th century in New Zealand